The Office for Nuclear Regulation (ONR) is the regulator for the nuclear industry in the United Kingdom. It is an independent statutory corporation whose costs are met by charging fees to the nuclear industry. The ONR reports to the Department for Work and Pensions, although it also worked closely with the now-defunct Department of Energy and Climate Change.

History
The establishment of the ONR followed a 2008 review conducted on behalf of the Government into the regulation of the UK civil nuclear industry, recommending the creation of a single industry specific regulator. The ONR was created on 1 April 2011 as a non-statutory agency of the Health and Safety Executive (HSE), with the Government intending to put the ONR on a statutory basis at a later date.
The ONR was formed from the merger of the HSE's Nuclear Directorate (the Nuclear Installations Inspectorate, the Office for Civil Nuclear Security and the UK Safeguards Office) and - from 1 June 2011 - the Department for Transport's Radioactive Materials Transport Team. Legislation to establish the ONR was included in the Energy Act 2013, and it was formally launched as an independent statutory corporation on 1 April 2014.
ONR’s original mission (as detailed in the DWP/ONR Framework document) was: "To provide efficient and effective regulation of the nuclear industry, holding it to account on behalf of the public". The 2013 Energy Act specified that ONR's five statutory purposes were: Nuclear safety; Nuclear site health and safety; Civil Nuclear security; Nuclear safeguards; Transport of radioactive materials.

The ONR is governed by a ten member board, and is accountable to Parliament through the Department for Work and Pensions (DWP) in matters of finance, governance and non-nuclear health and safety. Nick Baldwin, former chief executive of Powergen (now E.ON UK) was appointed part-time interim chair of the ONR on its formation, resigning as a non-executive director of Scottish and Southern Energy. On 21 February 2019, the Secretary of State for Work and Pensions announced Mark McAllister would succeed Nick Baldwin CBE as Chair of the Board. Mark McAllister began his five-year appointment as ONR Chair from 1 April 2019.
The ONR Board oversees the operation of the Chief Executive Officer (CEO) and the Chief Nuclear Inspector (CNI). John Jenkins, who was CEO from 20102 to 2015, resigned from his post on 28 February 2015 and was replaced by Les Philpott on 1 March 2015 as the Interim Chief Executive. Adriènne Kelbie was appointed Chief Executive and took up the appointment on 18 January 2016. 
In October 2017 Mark Foy was appointed Chief Nuclear Inspector; he was previously the Deputy Chief Nuclear Inspector.

New leadership arrangements commenced on 1 June 2021 which saw Mark Foy become ONR’s combined Chief Executive and Chief Nuclear Inspector.

As of 2021 it had about 650 staff and a budget of £95.05 million which was largely cost-recovered from users with a 2% grant from the DWP.

Generic Design Assessment process
Following the 2006 Energy review the Nuclear Installations Inspectorate developed the Generic Design Assessment process (GDA), now operated by ONR, to assess new nuclear reactor designs ahead of site-specific proposals. The GDA initially started assessing four designs:

Westinghouse AP1000
Areva EPR
CANDU ACR-1000
GE-Hitachi ESBWR

However the ACR-1000 and ESBWR were subsequently withdrawn from the assessment for commercial reasons, leaving the EPR and AP1000 as contenders for British new nuclear builds. Assessment of the AP1000 was suspended in December 2011 at Westinghouse's request, awaiting a firm UK customer before addressing issues raised by the assessment.

In 2012 Hitachi purchased Horizon Nuclear Power, announcing intent to build two to three 1,350 MWe Advanced Boiling Water Reactors (ABWR) on both of Horizon's sites. The GDA was agreed in April 2013.

In August 2014 Westinghouse resumed the AP1000 assessment, after Toshiba and ENGIE purchased NuGeneration and announced plans to develop Moorside Nuclear Power Station with 3 AP1000s. In November 2016 the ONR noted there was a "very large amount of assessment to complete with issues still emerging".
On 30 March 2017 the AP1000 successfully completed the GDA process, ironically the day after the designer, Westinghouse, filed for Chapter 11 bankruptcy because of $9 billion of losses from its nuclear reactor construction projects, mostly the construction of four AP1000 reactors in the U.S.

On 21 September 2015 Energy Secretary Amber Rudd announced that a Chinese designed nuclear power station was expected to be built at Bradwell nuclear power station.
On 19 January 2017 the GDA process for the Hualong One (HPR1000) started, and successfully finished in February 2022.

The ABWR GDA process completed successfully in December 2017.

On 1 April 2022, the GDA of the 470 MWe Rolls-Royce SMR started.  The assessment will begin once the timescales and resources have been agreed.

Nuclear defence activities

Although the ONR is primarily a civil regulator, the ONR Defence Programme regulates military nuclear and conventional safety across a number of licensed and non-licensed nuclear sites, which are operated for the Ministry of Defence (MOD) nuclear defence capability. This is carried out under a complex legal regime, in conjunction with MOD’s Defence Nuclear Safety Regulator (DNSR). The ONR does not influence the design of submarine nuclear power plants or nuclear weapons, and does not regulate security or transport of MOD nuclear materials.

ONR responsibility includes assessing the response systems for nuclear weapon accidents at HMNB Clyde and RNAD Coulport, in Argyll, Scotland.

Since about 2013 the ONR has given the two major Atomic Weapons Establishment (AWE) sites enhanced regulatory attention due to "safety and compliance concerns, and the continued undertaking of operations in ageing facilities due to delays to the delivery of modern standard replacement facilities." The ONR anticipated AWE would move back to normal regulatory attention in 2021 after the new facilities are completed.

See also

Nuclear power in the United Kingdom

References

External links

2011 establishments in the United Kingdom
Government agencies established in 2011
Nuclear energy in the United Kingdom
Statutory corporations of the United Kingdom government
Safety organizations
Occupational safety and health organizations
Trident (UK nuclear programme)
Organisations based in Merseyside
Metropolitan Borough of Sefton
Radiation protection organizations
Regulators of the United Kingdom
Department for Work and Pensions
Department of Energy and Climate Change